Edward Watts may refer to:

 Eddie Watts (1912–1982), English cricketer
 Edward Watts (director), English filmmaker